Sayyid Sibte Jaffar Zaidi or commonly known as Ustad Sibte Jaffar (Urdu: اُستاد سبطِ جعفر) (born 1957) was a Pakistani professor, poet, advocate, principal, religious reciter, writer and social worker.

A principal, a teacher, a poet, and mentor. He started 7 colleges in interior sindh, each costing around Rs 6 million. He had set up educational centers. Apart from looking after educational wings of around 5 welfare organizations, he was overseeing numerous charity organizations and orphanages. He received an Honorary award from Harvard University. He ran a school in Tando Adam where Muslim and Hindus studied for free. He was a poet, an intellectual, a principal in a college. He was shot down when he was returning from his college on his bike.

Born and raised in Shia Muslim family, Sibte Jaffer got the early attachment with Ahl al-Bayt. Sibte Jaffer chose to write poetry for Ahl al-Bayt, through this Zaidi started getting momentum among masses, he used to recite Eulogies which was written by himself in different Majalis organized by different people at different locations mostly in Karachi, Pakistan. His skilled poetry and unique recitation style gave him the Title of "Sha'ir-e-Ahle Bait" (Poet of Ahle Bait).

He is also the paternal grandson of Nasim Amrohvi and childhood bestfriend of Rehan Azmi

Manqabats 
 Jab Imam Ayenge
 jab khuda ko pukara Ali aa gae

Death
Sibt e Jaafar was killed by two people who were on a motorcycle in Liaquatabad, Karachi on 18 March 2013.

On 4 April 2013, the two suspects were arrested in Karachi.

References

2013 deaths
Muhajir people
People from Karachi
Targeted killings in Pakistan
2013 murders in Pakistan
People murdered in Karachi
Assassinated Pakistani people
Deaths by firearm in Sindh
1957 births
Pakistani Shia Muslims
Twelvers